Maria Julia Zaleska de domo Perłowska (1831 in Medwedówka near the Chyhyryn – 10 April 1889 in Warsaw) was a Polish writer, prosaist and publicist. Editor of weekly magazine Wieczory Rodzinne [Family evenings] (since 1880).

Zaleska was an author of pioneer and widely read popular science belletristic talks Wieczory czwartkowe [Thursday evenings] (1871), Wędrówki po niebie i ziemi [Wander through the sky and the ground] (1873), Obraz świata roślinnego [Scene of a plant world] (1875), Przygody młodego podróżnika w Tatrach [Adventures of the young traveller in Tatra Mountains] (1882). She was also an author of science-fiction novel Niezgodni królewicze [Dissident princes] (1889), adaptations Młody wygnaniec [Young exile] (based on themes of James Fenimore Cooper works; 1889) and Mieszkaniec puszczy [Wildernessian] (based on themes of Richard Roth works; 1894).

References

 
 

1831 births
1889 deaths
Polish children's writers
Polish women novelists
Polish publicists
Polish science fiction writers
Women science fiction and fantasy writers
19th-century Polish novelists
Polish women children's writers
19th-century Polish women writers
19th-century Polish writers